Parliamentary elections were held in Gazankulu on 17 October 1973.

Electoral system

The election was made on the basis of 26 seats. In addition, there were 42 ex-officio seats.

References

1973 elections in South Africa
Elections in South African bantustans
Gazankulu